"No Smoke Without a Fire" is a song by English rock group Bad Company, released as the second single from their eighth studio album Dangerous Age.

Despite failing to match the success of the album's first single, "Shake It Up", "No Smoke Without a Fire" was played substantially with "Shake It Up" on rock radio stations at the time of its release, eventually reaching a peak of #4 on the Billboard Mainstream Rock Tracks chart.

Cash Box called it "an auspicious come-back effort for Bad Company," saying that "a boulder-heavy signature track lumbers away under an inspired vocal effort."

The song is one of the songs listed on Clear Channel's list of "songs with questionable lyrics" following the September 11, 2001 attacks.

Track listing

7" single
 "No Smoke Without a Fire" - 4:33
 "Love Attack" - 3:51

12" single
 "No Smoke Without a Fire" (LP version) - 4:33
 "No Smoke Without a Fire" - 4:33

12" vinyl single (Germany)

 "No Smoke Without a Fire" (Remix) - 6:01
"No Smoke Without a Fire" (LP version) - 4:33
 "Love Attack" (LP version) - 3:55

Charts

References

https://www.discogs.com/de/Bad-Company-No-Smoke-Without-A=Fire/release/5499065

1989 singles
Bad Company songs
1988 songs
Atlantic Records singles
Songs written by Brian Howe (singer)